Mariama Owusu is a Ghanaian jurist. Currently  a judge of the Appeal Court, she was nominated Supreme Court Judge in November 2019 and vetted on 9 December 2019. She was sworn in on 17 December 2019. Prior to her appointment, she had served on the bench for thirty-eight (38) years.

Early life and education
Mariama Owusu hails from Beposo in the Ashanti Region of Ghana. She had her secondary education at T.I. Ahmadiyya Secondary School, Kumasi (T.I. Amass) from Form One to Upper Six.

Career
She begun serving on the bench as a District Magistrate from 1990 to 1992. She became a Circuit Court judge in 1992 and served in that capacity until 2000 when she was made a High Court judge. In 2003, she was appointed as the supervising High Court judge for Sunyani until 2005. She remained a High Court judge until 2006 when she sat on the Court of Appeal. She had been a justice of the Court of Appeal until her nomination for the role of Supreme Court Judge in November 2019. She was sworn into office on 17 December 2019.

Owusu has served as the president of the Ghana Chapter of the International Association of Women Judges for a period of four years. She has also served as a member of the Ethics Committee of the Judicial Service. From 2010 to 2014, she was a member of the Performing Assets Committee, Judicial Service.

She was part of a seven-member panel that did the hearing of the 2020 election petition by John Mahama against The Electoral Commission of Ghana and Nana Akufo-Addo.

See also
List of judges of the Supreme Court of Ghana
Supreme Court of Ghana

References

Date of birth missing (living people)
Living people
Justices of the Supreme Court of Ghana
People from Ashanti Region
Ghanaian women judges
20th-century judges
21st-century judges
20th-century women judges
21st-century women judges
T.I. Ahmadiyya Senior High School (Kumasi) alumni
1954 births